The Mentzel Baltic Fox is a German ultralight and light-sport flying boat that was designed by Anno Claus Mentzel and produced by Ing Büro Mentzel of Prinzhöfte, certified in 2009. The aircraft is supplied as a complete ready-to-fly-aircraft, disassembled for transport.

Design and development
The Baltic Fox was designed as a specialist aircraft for use by expeditions and, as such, it was intended to be disassembled for shipping in boxes to its destination and then rapidly reassembled and flown. It was intended to comply with the Fédération Aéronautique Internationale microlight rules and US light-sport aircraft rules. It features a strut-braced high-wing, a two-seats-in-side-by-side configuration open cockpit, retractible tricycle landing gear and a single engine in pusher configuration.

The aircraft is made from bolted-together aluminum tubing, with its flying surfaces covered in Dacron sailcloth. The standard engine available is the  Hirth 3702 three cylinder two-stroke powerplant.

Variants
Baltic Fox
Initial model, flying boat only, without wheeled landing gear. Certified in Germany as an ultralight in 2009.
Baltic Fox Sea
Second model, amphibious flying boat with wheeled landing gear, undergoing ultralight certification in 2011.

Specifications (Baltic Fox)

References

External links

2000s German ultralight aircraft
Light-sport aircraft
Single-engined pusher aircraft